The canton of Toul is an administrative division of the Meurthe-et-Moselle department, northeastern France. It was created at the French canton reorganisation which came into effect in March 2015. Its seat is in Toul.

It consists of the following communes:

Bicqueley
Charmes-la-Côte
Chaudeney-sur-Moselle
Choloy-Ménillot
Dommartin-lès-Toul
Domgermain
Écrouves
Foug
Gye
Laneuveville-derrière-Foug
Lay-Saint-Remy
Pagney-derrière-Barine
Pierre-la-Treiche
Toul
Villey-le-Sec

References

Cantons of Meurthe-et-Moselle